Florence is a census-designated place in and the county seat of Florence County, Wisconsin, United States. Florence is located in northern Florence County, in the town of Florence. Florence has a post office with ZIP code 54121. The community was named a census-designated place in 2010. As of the 2010 census, its population was 592.

History
Florence and the area surrounding belonged to the Menominee and was a hunting and trapping region until iron was discovered there in the 1870s. The Florence Mine was discovered in October of 1874 by H. D. Fisher. The mine was named in 1879 after the wife of Nelson Powell Hulst, Florence Terry Hulst. 

The county subsequently took on the same name.

Geography
Florence is situated in the Northern Highland region of Wisconsin near the Michigan border. Fisher Lake is located to the south of the community, and Fisher Creek runs to its east. US Highway 2 and US Highway 141 run through the community, and Wisconsin Highway 70 and Wisconsin Highway 101 terminate in western Florence; County Highway N also serves the community.

Education
Florence High School is the area's public high school.

Notable people
 Kenneth L. Greenquist, member of the Wisconsin State Senate, was born in Florence.
 Charles White Whittlesey, Medal of Honor recipient in World War I, was born in Florence.

Images

See also
 List of census-designated places in Wisconsin

References

External links

 Sanborn fire insurance maps: 1884 1891 1898 1904

Census-designated places in Florence County, Wisconsin
Census-designated places in Wisconsin
County seats in Wisconsin
Iron Mountain micropolitan area